Artabanus IV, also known as Ardavan IV (Parthian:𐭓𐭕𐭐𐭍), incorrectly known in older scholarship as Artabanus V, was the last ruler of the Parthian Empire from c. 213 to 224. He was the younger son of Vologases V, who died in 208.

Name 
 is the Latin form of the Greek Artábanos, itself from the Old Persian *Arta-bānu ("the glory of Arta."). The Parthian and Middle Persian variant was Ardawān.

Reign

Dynastic struggles and war with the Romans
In , Vologases VI succeeded his father Vologases V as king of the Parthian Empire. His rule was unquestioned for a few years, till his brother Artabanus IV rebelled. The dynastic struggle between the two brothers most likely started about 213. Artabanus successfully conquered much of the empire, including Media and Susa. Vologases VI seems to have only managed to keep Seleucia, where he minted coins. The Roman emperor Caracalla sought to take advantage of the conflict between the two brothers. He tried to find a pretext to invade the Parthian Empire by requesting Vologases to send two refugees—a philosopher named Antiochus and a certain Tiridates, who was possibly either an Armenian prince or an uncle of Vologases. To the surprise of the Romans, Vologases had the two men sent to Caracalla in 215, thus denying him his pretext. Caracalla's choice of contacting Vologases instead of Artabanus shows that the Romans still saw him as the dominant king.

Caracalla thus chose to preoccupy himself with an invasion of Armenia. He appointed a freedman named Theocritus as the leader of the invasion, which eventually ended in a disaster. Caracalla then once again sought to start a war with the Parthians. In another attempt to gain a pretext, he requested Artabanus to marry his daughter, which he declined. It is disputed whether Caracalla's proposal was sincere or not. Caracalla's choice to contact Artabanus shows that the latter was now considered the dominant king over Vologases, who would rule a small principality centered around Seleucia until 221/2. Artabanus soon clashed with Caracalla, whose forces he managed to contain at Nisibis in 217. Peace was made between the two empires the following year, with the Arsacids keeping most of Mesopotamia. However, Artabanus still had to deal with his brother Vologases, who continued to mint coins and challenge him.

War with the Sasanians

The Sasanian family had meanwhile quickly risen to prominence in their native Pars, and had now under prince Ardashir I begun to conquer the neighboring regions and more far territories, such as Kirman. At first, Ardashir I's activities did not alarm Artabanus, until later, when the Arsacid king finally chose to confront him. According to al-Tabari, whose work was probably based on Sasanian sources, Ardashir I and Artabanus agreed to meet in Hormozdgan at the end of the month of Mihr (April). Nonetheless, Ardashir I went to the place before due time to occupy an advantageous spot on the plain. There he dug out a ditch to defend himself and his forces. He also took over a spring at the place. Ardashir I's forces numbered 10,000 cavalry, with some of them wearing flexible chain armor akin to that of the Romans. Artabanus led a greater number of soldiers, who, however, were less disposed, due to wearing the inconvenient lamellar armor. Ardashir I's son and heir, Shapur I, as portrayed in the Sasanian rock reliefs, also took part in the battle. The battle was fought on 28 April 224, with Artabanus being defeated and killed, marking the end of the Arsacid era and the start of 427 years of Sasanian rule.

Aftermath 
The chief secretary of Artabanus, Dad-windad, was afterwards executed by Ardashir I. Thenceforth, Ardashir I assumed the title of shahanshah ("King of Kings") and started the conquest of an area which would be called Iranshahr (Ērānshahr). He celebrated his victory by having two rock reliefs sculptured at the Sasanian royal city of Ardashir-Khwarrah (present-day Firuzabad) in his homeland, Pars. The first relief portrays three scenes of personal fighting; starting from the left, a Persian aristocrat seizing a Parthian soldier; Shapur impaling the Parthian minister Dad-windad with his lance; and Ardashir I ousting Artabanus IV. The second relief, conceivably intended to portray the aftermath of the battle, displays the triumphant Ardashir I being given the badge of kingship over a fire shrine from the Zoroastrian supreme god Ahura Mazda, while Shapur and two other princes are watching from behind.

Vologases VI was driven out of Mesopotamia by Ardashir I's forces soon after 228. The leading Parthian noble-families (known as the Seven Great Houses of Iran) continued to hold power in Iran, now with the Sasanians as their new overlords. The early Sasanian army (spah) was identical to the Parthian one. Indeed, the majority of the Sasanian cavalry were composed of the very Parthian nobles that had once served the Arsacids. Memories of the Arsacid Empire never completely vanished, with efforts trying to restore the empire in the late 6th-century made by the Parthian dynasts Bahram Chobin and Vistahm, which ultimately proved unsuccessful.

References

Sources

 
 
 
 
 
 
 
 
 
 
 
 
 
 

3rd-century Parthian monarchs
Year of birth unknown
224 deaths
People of the Roman–Parthian Wars
3rd-century Iranian people
Monarchs killed in action